Hustler TV is a subscription based adult entertainment pay television channel distributed throughout Europe via digital cable as naxoo (in Switzerland) and satellite television. It is owned by the Dutch-based company Sapphire Media International BV.

Hustler TV and Hustler HD 3D offers hardcore pornography aimed at a straight male audience. It is the sister channel to Blue Hustler who specializes in softcore pornography.

See also
Blue Hustler
Hustler TV (US)
Hustler TV Canada

References

External links

British pornographic television channels
Pornographic television channels
Television pornography